The 2020–2021 Bikarkeppni karla, named Vís bikarinn for sponsorship reasons, was the 55th edition of the Icelandic Men's Basketball Cup, won by Njarðvík against Stjarnan. The competition was managed by the Icelandic Basketball Association (KKÍ) and the cup final was played in Smárinn, Kópavogur, and broadcast live on RÚV. Dedrick Basile was named the Cup Finals MVP after turning in 24 points and 7 assists.

Participating teams
Initially twenty-five teams signed up for the Cup tournament. In October 2020, the tournament was postponed, first for two weeks and later indefinitely due to another Coronavirus outbreak in Iceland. On 28 January 2021, KKÍ announced that the competition would begin on 22 April and end on 1 May, featuring 16 teams and would be sponsored by the insurance company VÍS. It was later postponed to August 2021 with the first game played on 28 August.

Bracket

Cup Finals MVP

References

External links
2020–2021 Tournament results

Men's Cup
2020–21 in European basketball leagues